Mark C. Montigny (born June 20, 1961) is a Massachusetts state senator for the Second Bristol and Plymouth district, which includes his hometown of New Bedford and several nearby towns. He is a Democrat who has served since 1993.

See also
 2019–2020 Massachusetts legislature
 2021–2022 Massachusetts legislature

References

Democratic Party Massachusetts state senators
Politicians from New Bedford, Massachusetts
Living people
1961 births
21st-century American politicians